"Lieserl" is a science fiction  short story by British writer Stephen Baxter, originally published in Interzone in 1993. Appearing also in his    anthology Vacuum Diagrams, it represents a small, but integral part of the novel  Ring.

Plot summary

Set primarily on Earth in the year A.D. 3951, Lieserl documents the title character's life from birth until shortly after her physical death. The story explains how the development of nanobots has enabled virtual immortality for humans by virtue of the nanotechnological manipulation of the chemical processes that cause cells to die. Lieserl's body is engineered by such nanobots but, instead of extending her life, the nanobots cause her to age rapidly. Memories and learning are also implanted into her cortex. The combination of these effects results in Lieserl living the equivalent of 90 year life in 90 days.

Upon her physical death Lieserl's awareness is downloaded into a number of datastores, granting her a supreme consciousness. These datastores are placed within one mouth, or Interface, of a man-made wormhole which is then suspended within the Sun. The other Interface of the wormhole is left in orbit around the Sun and the pumping away of superheated gas from the Interface within the sun to the other Interface provides a refrigeration effect enabling the datastores holding Lieserl's consciousness to survive.

Lieserl is told that her existence is just one of many projects initiated by mankind to ensure the survival of the species. Lieserl's task is to study the sun since it appears to be dying, aging more quickly than was to be expected without some exterior influence. The story ends just as Lieserl begins in her work without revealing the nature of the threat to the Sun. Nevertheless, the final passages of the story contain a foreshadowing of the dark future facing the universe when Phillida, Lieserl's mother, announces that mankind "can live as long as the stars - for tens of billions of years". The novel Ring and the short stories Secret History and The Baryonic Lords, also within the Vacuum Diagrams collection, tell of the premature aging of stars caused by a dark matter life-form named photino birds and, as a consequence, the end of baryonic life within the universe.

Although the reason for Lieserl's task is an integral part of Stephen Baxter's Xeelee Sequence, the majority of the story is devoted to a study of the character, Lieserl, and the pain she suffers as a result of her accelerated existence. The daily loss of innocence prevents her from achieving minor victories against childhood rivals and causes additional frustrations by making the interesting projects of one day, such as exploring the history and mathematics of the game, snakes and ladders, seem trivial and childlike when she returns to them the day after. Her sexuality is explored, with her puberty passing in a moment and her hopes of romance being dashed as she outgrows a 15-year-old over the course of a single night. These negative experiences leave Lieserl feeling bitter towards her creators, but nevertheless imprint on her a humanity which ensures her long-term devotion to the project for which she was born and a strong desire to ensure the maintenance of the human race.

Historical references
The story includes a lengthy discussion of the history and mathematics behind the game of snakes and ladders.

It has been speculated that the character, Lieserl, is named after Lieserl Einstein, the illegitimate daughter of Albert Einstein and Mileva Maric.

List of science fiction concepts
Anti-Senescence
Dark matter
Implanted Education
Modified life-cycle of the Sun
Man-made wormholes
Mind transfer
Nanotechnology
Virtual reality

References

1993 short stories
Short stories by Stephen Baxter
Works originally published in Interzone (magazine)
Fiction set in the 4th millennium
Nanotechnology in fiction